Christchurch Country was a parliamentary electorate in the Canterbury region of New Zealand from 1853 to 1860. It was thus one of the original 24 electorates used for the 1st New Zealand Parliament.

Geography
The area covered by the Christchurch Country electorate was synonymous with the original area of Canterbury Province, i.e. covering all land from the east coast to the west coast of the South Island that lay north of Otago Province (covered by the  electorate) and south of Nelson Province (covered by the  electorate on the east coast; the west coast was virtually uninhibited by Europeans and initially not covered by an electorate). Thus, the Christchurch Country electorate extended from Awarua Point to the Grey River on the West Coast, and from the Waitaki River to the Hurunui River.

History
The electorate was created for the first Parliament as a two-member electorate.

The nomination meeting for the first election was held on 16 August 1853 at the Christchurch Land Office, together with the nomination meeting for the Town of Christchurch electorate. The first election was held on Saturday, 27 August between 9 am and 4 pm at the Resident Magistrate's Office in Christchurch, with Charles Simeon acting as the returning officer. James Stuart-Wortley and Jerningham Wakefield were the first two representatives. Wakefield served until the end of the parliamentary term. Stuart-Wortley resigned on 18 July 1855. As Parliament was dissolved on 15 September 1855, no by-election was held to fill the vacancy.

Charles Bowen acted as returning officer. Four candidates were proposed for the Christchurch Country electorate, and the election date was set for Thursday, 20 December. Henry Sewell was the only candidate for the Town of Christchurch electorate, and he was declared elected. Two days later, polling booths were in Christchurch, Lyttelton, and Kaiapoi, and the successful candidates were John Hall and Dingley Askham Brittin, who defeated John Ollivier and Crosbie Ward. Hall later became New Zealand's 12th Premier (1879–82).

Members of Parliament
The electorate was represented by seven Members of Parliament.

Key

Election results

1856 by-election

1855 election

 
 
 
 
 
 
 

Table footnotes:

1853 election

 
 
 
 
 
 

Table footnotes:

Notes

References

Historical electorates of New Zealand
Politics of Canterbury, New Zealand
1853 establishments in New Zealand
1860 disestablishments in New Zealand